Eat to Live: The Amazing Nutrient-Rich Program for Fast and Sustained Weight Loss is a book written in 2003 by Joel Fuhrman. A revised version was released in 2011. The book offers a formula for weight loss that health equals nutrients divided by calories. The diet is vegetarian, vegan, low-salt, low-fat, and gluten-free for the first six weeks, after which animal products may be added. The diet is considered "extremely restrictive" for its restrictions against snacks, sugar, and oils.

Notes

2003 non-fiction books
Weight loss